Sport Clube Itupiranga, or simply Itupiranga, is a Brazilian football club based in Itupiranga, Pará state.

Stadium
Itupiranga play their home games at Estádio Jaime Sena Pimentel. The stadium has a maximum capacity of 1,000 people.

Honours
 Campeonato Paraense Second Division
 Winners (1): 2019

References

External links
 Sport Clube Itupiranga on Facebook

Association football clubs established in 2018
Itupiranga
2018 establishments in Brazil